Nový Hrádek is a market town in Náchod District in the Hradec Králové Region of the Czech Republic. It has about 900 inhabitants.

Administrative parts
Villages of Dlouhé, Krahulčí and Rzy are administrative parts of Nový Hrádek.

References

Market towns in the Czech Republic